Campanula betulifolia, the birch-leaved bellflower, is a flowering plant in the family Campanulaceae, native to Turkey, where it grows in crevices in volcanic cliffs. The plant was named in 1850 by the German botanist Karl Koch, following plant-collecting expeditions to the Caucasus.

In late Spring, clusters of narrow pink buds open to white bell-shaped flowers. There is also a pink-flowered form. As it has a cascading habit and requires sharp drainage it is suitable for planting in an elevated position in a rockery or alpine garden.

In cultivation in the UK this plant was accorded the Royal Horticultural Society’s Award of Garden Merit in 1993.

References

betulifolia
Flora of Turkey
Plants described in 1850